The 6th constituency of Maine-et-Loire (French: Sixième circonscription de Maine-et-Loire) is a French legislative constituency in the Maine-et-Loire département. Like the other 576 French constituencies, it elects one MP using a two round electoral system.

Description

The 6th Constituency of Maine-et-Loire is situated in the west of the department. Whilst it includes the western parts of Angers it is a largely rural seat.

Up until 2012 the voters of this constituency favoured candidates from the centre right.

Assembly members

Election results

2022

2017

 
 
 
 
 
 
|-
| colspan="8" bgcolor="#E9E9E9"|
|-

2012

 
 
 
 
 
 
 
|-
| colspan="8" bgcolor="#E9E9E9"|
|-

References

6